Marcus "Husky" Wallenberg (born September 2, 1956) is a Swedish banker and industrialist.

Early life
Marcus Wallenberg was born on September 2, 1956 in Stockholm, Sweden. His father, Marc Wallenberg, was a banker. His mother is Olga Wehtje. He is a member of the prominent Wallenberg family.

Wallenberg has a BSc degree from the Edmund A. Walsh School of Foreign Service. He served as a lieutenant in the Royal Swedish Naval Academy in 1977.

Career
Wallenberg began his career in the New York City office of Citibank in 1980–1982. He subsequently worked for Deutsche Bank, followed by S. G. Warburg & Co., Citicorp and the SEB Group.

Wallenberg served as the President and CEO of Investor from 1999 to 2005. He served as the Chairman of the International Chamber of Commerce from 2006 to 2008.

Wallenberg is the Vice Chairman of the Institute of International Finance. He serves on the board of directors of Skandinaviska Enskilda Banken, Electrolux, Ericsson, LKAB, AstraZeneca, Stora Enso, Saab, and Knut and Alice Wallenberg Foundation. He is a member of the Steering Committee of the Bilderberg Group.

He is also a former member of the board of directors of Temasek Holdings and currently on the Temasek International Panel.

Personal life
Wallenberg has three children from his first marriage to Caroline Wallenberg (née Månsson). He is married to Fanny Sachs, an architect. They have one child together. They reside at the family mansion, Täcka Udden.

References

Sources

External links
 Saab Group webpage

1956 births
Living people
Members of the Steering Committee of the Bilderberg Group
Marcus Wallenberg
Electrolux people
Businesspeople from Stockholm
Walsh School of Foreign Service alumni
20th-century Swedish businesspeople
21st-century Swedish businesspeople